Laubert is a commune in the Lozère department in southern France.

Inhabitants of Laubert are called Laubertois in French.

Geography

History

The church
A chapel was founded in 1278, which was destroyed 1636, and rebuilt in 1773. The chapel was replaced by the present church in 1825.

The church tower is "en peigne". The commune's council refounded the main bell in 1963, because it was cracked.

A little fountain at the base of the church adds to the village's charm.

In it are:
 a 15th-century Christ in multicoloured wood,
 a virgin and child from the seventeenth century in gilded wood,
 an Atlas supporting the pulpit (there are three other Atlases of this type in Lozère),
 a gilded and painted retable, with turned columns, which came from the Capuchin church at Mende, topped with two urns.

The castle
The old castle cannot be visited. Only the outside and the ramparts are visible.

See also
Communes of the Lozère department

References

External links

Laubert

Communes of Lozère